Seizure is the second album by New Zealand musician Chris Knox, released in 1989 by record label Flying Nun.

Track listing 

 "The Face of Fashion"
 "The Woman Inside of Me"
 "Statement of Intent"
 "Filling Me"
 "Not Given Lightly"
 "Break!"
 "Uncle Tom's Cabin"
 "Wanna!!"
 "And I Will Cry"
 "Rapist"
 "Grand Mal"
 "Voyeur"
 "Honesty's Not Enough"
 "My Dumb Luck"
 "Ache"

Reception 

Trouser Press called it "a brilliant record, with one marvel of wit, melody and DIY production after another".

References

External links 

 

1989 albums
1989 in New Zealand
Chris Knox albums